Lady Lake Historical Society Museum is a local history museum in Lady Lake, Lake County, Florida. Exhibits include citrus industry artifacts, a miniature HO gauge railroad, furniture, tools, photographs, and memorabilia. The museum is located behind a log cabin on Lady Lake Boulevard.

See also
List of museums in Florida

External links
Historical Museum Town of Lady Lake

Museums in Lake County, Florida
Historical society museums in Florida